Unrestricted is the third studio album by rapper Da Brat. It was released on April 11, 2000. On September 21, 2001, it was certified platinum by the RIAA.

Track listing

 signifies a co-producer

Charts

Weekly charts

Year-end charts

Certifications

References

Da Brat albums
2000 albums
So So Def Recordings albums
Albums produced by Timbaland
Albums produced by Kanye West
Albums produced by Jermaine Dupri
Albums produced by Bryan-Michael Cox